Masoud Esmaeilpour Jouybari (born 6 August 1988 in Jouybar) is an Iranian wrestler, Asian champion and multiple medalist at the world championships in the lightweight freestyle.

He represented Iran at the Wrestling Men's freestyle 60 kg event at the 2012 Summer Olympics.

References

External links
 
 

• Masoud Esmaeilpour on Instagram

• Masoud Esmaeilpour  Googel

1988 births
Living people
Iranian male sport wrestlers
Olympic wrestlers of Iran
Wrestlers at the 2012 Summer Olympics
Wrestlers at the 2014 Asian Games
Asian Games medalists in wrestling
Asian Games gold medalists for Iran
World Wrestling Championships medalists
Medalists at the 2014 Asian Games
People from Juybar
Asian Wrestling Championships medalists
Islamic Solidarity Games medalists in wrestling
Sportspeople from Mazandaran province
21st-century Iranian people
Islamic Solidarity Games competitors for Iran